In mathematics, especially in set theory, two ordered sets  and  are said to have the same order type if they are order isomorphic, that is, if there exists a bijection (each element pairs with exactly one in the other set)  such that both  and its inverse are monotonic (preserving orders of elements). In the special case when  is totally ordered, monotonicity of  implies monotonicity of its inverse.

For example, the set of integers and the set of even integers have the same order type, because the mapping  is a bijection that preserves the order.  But the set of integers and the set of rational numbers (with the standard ordering) do not have the same order type, because even though the sets are of the same size (they are both countably infinite), there is no order-preserving bijective mapping between them.  To these two order types we may add two more: the set of positive integers (which has a least element), and that of negative integers (which has a greatest element).  The open interval  of rationals is order isomorphic to the rationals (since, for example,  is a strictly increasing bijection from the former to the latter); the rationals contained in the half-closed intervals [0,1) and (0,1], and the closed interval [0,1], are three additional order type examples.

Since order-equivalence is an equivalence relation, it partitions the class of all ordered sets into equivalence classes.

Order type of well-orderings

Every well-ordered set is order-equivalent to exactly one ordinal number, by definition. The ordinal numbers are taken to be the canonical representatives of their classes, and so the order type of a well-ordered set is usually identified with the corresponding ordinal.

For example, consider the set  of even ordinals less than :

Its order type is:

because there are 2 separate lists of counting and 4 in sequence at the end.

Rational numbers
Any countable totally ordered set can be mapped injectively into the rational numbers in an order-preserving way.
Any dense countable totally ordered set with no highest and no lowest element can be mapped bijectively onto the rational numbers in an order-preserving way.

Notation 

See also

Well-order

External links

References

Ordinal numbers